Larry O'Neill is a 1915 short silent American drama film directed by Clem Easton and starring William Garwood and Violet Mersereau. Also starring Portuguese actor Hal De Forrest.

External links

1915 drama films
1915 films
Silent American drama films
American silent short films
American black-and-white films
1915 short films
1910s American films